Clash of Eagles is a 1990 alternate history novel by Leo Rutman.

Plot summary
December, 1941. Nazi Germany has vanquished the United Kingdom and launches a major invasion across the Atlantic. German forces under Erwin Rommel land in Quebec and sweep down on Canada, New England, and the Ohio Valley to New York City and declared the eastern United States an occupied territory. The rest of the United States remains unoccupied but perilously exposed to further attacks. President Franklin D. Roosevelt and the government administration evacuate the endangered Washington, D.C. and flee westward to California. Life in the major cities has become a grim nightmare as the new Nazi regime takes over. But slowly, quietly, a resistance movement has begun to grow. Determined to rout the invaders, brave and angry men and women from longshoremen, laborers, gangsters, actresses, street hoods, socialites, and vagrants will rise up against history's greatest evil. They will fight to the death, some at the cost of their lives to take their country back.

References in other works
Gavriel David Rosenfeld, a lecturer in (actual) history at the University of California, Los Angeles, cited Clash of Eagles in his novel The World Hitler Never Made.

See also

Hypothetical Axis victory in World War II – includes an extensive list of other Wikipedia articles regarding works of Nazi Germany/Axis/World War II alternate history

References

External links
 Clash of Eagles on Uchronia
 
 "The Third Reich and Allohistorical Normalization" Book Essay on: Gavriel D. Rosenfeld, The World Hitler Never Made (with mention of Clash of Eagles)

1990 novels
Alternate Nazi Germany novels
Fiction set in 1941